Giovanni Bucaro (born 20 November 1970) is an Italian football manager, and former footballer who played as a defender during the 1990s, currently in charge as assistant coach of Pescara.

Career

Player
Bucaro began his playing career with Sorrento.  He started off with the Rossoneri in their youth team and went on to make 31 appearances for the first team between 1986 and 1988.  In 1988, he joined Foggia who were then in the 3rd division of Italian football.  In 1989 his second season saw the arrival of manager Zdeněk Zeman, whose aggressive and entertaining style of football saw Foggia enter the greatest period in its history went it eventually reached Serie A in 1991.  Zeman achieved promotion to Serie B in his first season and Bucaro played a key role in defence in this promotion winning team.  Following another successful season for Foggia, who achieved promotion to Serie A as champions, Bucaro was sold to Fiorentina. He failed to make an appearance for the Tuscan side and was moved onto Modena in 1991 for whom he made 22 appearances.

Following this solitary season at Modena he joined Bologna for whom he made 29 appearances.  By 1993 he had rejoined Foggia for whom he played in their final season in Serie A before they were relegated to Serie B in 1995.  Bucaro played another season for Foggia in 1995-1996 when the club finished mid table.  He joined SPAL the following season and made 17 appearances in the 3rd division.  Remaining in the lower divisions of Italian football he joined Ascoli and stayed for 3 seasons playing a total of 87 league games.  He then joined Avellino who were also then in the 3rd division and between 2000 and 2003 he played 46 games for the club.  In his final season with the club they achieved promotion back to Serie B by defeating Napoli in the play-off final.  It was their first time back in the second division in 11 years.  This was his final year as a player and he thus went out on a high note.

Manager
After spells as assistant manager at both Ascoli and Salernitana Bucaro began his first venture into management with Campobello in Serie D for the 2006–07 season, and then with Pomigliano. His success with Pomigliano saw him move up a division to manage Manfredonia in the 3rd tier of Italian football.  He helped Manfredonia to avoid relegation and this caught the attention of Juventus who invited him to join them as youth team coach for the 2010-2011 season. After spending a year at Juventus he joined Avellino as first team coach in August.

On 21 July 2012 Giovanni Bucaro was announced as the new manager of Sorrento.  He was presented to the press and stated that he hoped to emulate his one time manager Zeman in his new role as Sorrento coach. The 2012-2013 season began with a goalless draw against Gubbio and caused Bucaro to immediately lament the lack of a decent striker to help Sorrento's cause. He was sacked in January 2013 due to poor results.

In July 2014 he was named head coach of newly promoted Lega Pro club Savoia. He was however dismissed on 28 October 2014 due to poor results.

In April 2016 he was named new head coach of Arezzo to replace Ezio Capuano for the last three remaining games of the 2015–16 Lega Pro; his contract was not extended and he left by the end of the season.

He was successively hired as Avellino manager for the club's 2018–19 Serie D campaign, which ended with promotion to Serie C after winning a promotion playoff to Lanusei, as well as the nationwide Serie D championship title. He left Avellino on 24 July 2019 amid uncertainty regarding the future of the club.

On 25 October 2019, he was hired by Serie C club Sicula Leonzio until the end of the 2019–20 season. He was dismissed by Sicula Leonzio on 13 January 2020, after the club won just once in 10 games under his helm.

For the 2020–21 season, he was hired by Bisceglie. Bisceglie won 2 out of the first 3 games under him. However, on 1 February 2021, he was dismissed by Bisceglie, after only winning once and gaining 9 points in the next 17 games under his helm. He was called back in charge of Bisceglie just a couple months later, on 6 April, until the end of the season.

On 27 February 2023, he rejoined his former coach Zdeněk Zeman as his assistant at Pescara.

Honours

As a player 

 Foggia
 Serie B (1): 1990–91

 Avellino
 Serie C1/B play-off winners (1): 2004–05.

As a manager 
 Avellino
 Serie D (1): 2018–19.

References

External links
Giovanni Bucaro at Soccerway

1970 births
Living people
Footballers from Palermo
Italian footballers
Association football defenders
Italian football managers
U.S. Avellino 1912 managers
A.S.D.C. Pomigliano managers
Manfredonia Calcio managers
A.S.D. Sorrento managers
Serie B players
A.S.D. Sorrento players
Calcio Foggia 1920 players
Modena F.C. players
Bologna F.C. 1909 players
Ascoli Calcio 1898 F.C. players
U.S. Avellino 1912 players
Serie C managers